This article lists candidates who were considered for the Republican nomination for Vice President of the United States in the 2016 presidential election. Businessman Donald Trump of New York, the 2016 Republican nominee for President of the United States, considered several prominent Republicans and other individuals before selecting Governor Mike Pence of Indiana as his running mate on July 15, 2016. Pence formally won the vice presidential nomination on July 19, 2016, at the 2016 Republican National Convention. The Trump–Pence ticket would go on to win the 2016 election, defeating the Democratic ticket of Clinton–Kaine.

Vetting process and selection
Presumptive Republican presidential nominee Donald Trump turned his attention towards selecting a running mate after he became the presumptive nominee on May 4, 2016. Trump's rivals, Senator Ted Cruz of Texas and Governor John Kasich of Ohio, had begun their vice-presidential vetting processes by April 2016, but both dropped out from the race after the Indiana primary. Cruz had selected businesswoman Carly Fiorina. The vetting process begins with a thorough examination of public records, such as speeches and campaign finance reports. This is followed by a "full vet," in which potential vice presidential nominees are asked to submit detailed tax returns and medical records, and answer extensive questionnaires. Attorney Arthur B. Culvahouse, Jr. led the vetting process for the Trump campaign. Then-campaign manager Corey Lewandowski and Paul Manafort presented Trump with a list of sixteen names in mid-May, and, starting in June, the Trump campaign began vetting six individuals.

Final selection
On May 10, 2016, Trump told the Associated Press that he had narrowed his list of potential running mates to "five or six people" with a background in politics, as opposed to the military or business. However, on July 6, Trump stated that "about" ten people remained in the running as potential running mate selections. In mid-June, Eli Stokols and Burgess Everett of Politico reported that Trump's shortlist included Governor Chris Christie of New Jersey, former Speaker Newt Gingrich of Georgia, Senator Jeff Sessions of Alabama, and Governor Mary Fallin of Oklahoma. A June 30 report in The Washington Post also included Senators Bob Corker of Tennessee, Richard Burr of North Carolina, Tom Cotton of Arkansas, and Joni Ernst of Iowa, as well as Governor Mike Pence of Indiana, as individuals still being considered for the ticket. The Trump campaign also strongly considered Governor John Kasich of Ohio, considering him the "perfect choice," but Kasich refused to be considered for the ticket (or endorse the Trump campaign). In early July, Corker and Ernst both declined to be considered as Trump's running mate. Meanwhile, Trump stated that he was considering two military generals for the position, including retired Lieutenant General Michael Flynn. On July 12, NBC News reported that Trump was planning to formally introduce his eventual pick on July 15, though "it's not clear whether or not the identity of the pick could be released or could leak earlier in the week." The same article reported that he had narrowed his list down to Christie, Gingrich, and Pence.

Shortlist

Announcement 
On July 14, it was reported that Mike Pence had been selected as Donald Trump's running mate, following his acceptance of Trump's offer. Trump had planned to officially announce his choice on July 15 at 11 am. ET, in Manhattan, but, following a terrorist attack in Promenade des Anglais, Nice, France, announced the day prior that he would postpone the announcement. On the morning of July 15, Trump announced via Twitter his choice of Indiana Governor Mike Pence as his vice presidential running mate. Trump made the formal announcement at a news conference at 11 a.m. on July 16. Pence had been running for re-election as Governor of Indiana, but Indiana law prevented him from appearing on the election ballot twice, so Pence suspended his gubernatorial campaign. Within the Trump campaign, Pence emerged as a potential running mate in May due to the backing of senior advisers Kellyanne Conway and Paul Manafort. CNN reported that multiple sources told them that Trump had second thoughts on the Pence pick and attempted to pick Christie instead, though the Trump campaign denied those reports. Following the selection, The New York Times noted that Pence is a "sturdy and predictable politician" who has a strong appeal to the Christian right. On July 19, the second night of the 2016 Republican National Convention, Pence won the vice presidential nomination by acclamation.

Media speculation on possible selections

Members of Congress

Governors

Other Individuals

See also
Donald Trump 2016 presidential campaign
2016 Republican Party presidential candidates
2016 Republican Party presidential primaries
2016 Republican National Convention
2016 United States presidential election
List of United States major party presidential tickets

References

2016 United States presidential campaigns
Vice presidency of the United States
Republican Party (United States) campaigns
Mike Pence
Donald Trump 2016 presidential campaign
Chris Christie
Newt Gingrich
John Kasich
Rick Perry
Herman Cain
Rudy Giuliani